Shanzhai is a Chinese term literally meaning "mountain fortress" or "mountain camp", whose contemporary use usually encompasses counterfeit, imitation, or parody products and events and the subculture surrounding them. Shanzhai products can include counterfeit consumer and electronic goods, which can involve the imitation and trademark infringement of brands and companies. The term's modern usage grew around 2008 when counterfeit smartphones reached their greatest domestic use. Today, some relate the term with grassroots innovation and creativity rather than with falsehood or imitation.

Origin
The term shanzhai was first used for its literal meaning, which referred to defensible mountain forts and strongholds, usually in areas on the outer reaches of imperial government control. During the Song dynasty (960–1279), shanzhai came to describe groups of bandits who opposed and evaded the corrupt authorities to perform deeds they saw as justified. One of the most well known uses of shanzhai in this way is in the story Water Margin.

Shanzhai goods are often regarded as rebelling against the established commercial market, adopting the spirit of opposition and individuality that the term was originally associated with during the Song dynasty. Some shanzhai products are created with the intent to deceive buyers, although others are created with features not included in their respective authentic counterparts, or are created out of jest or parody (such as the CCSTV New Year's Gala).

Products
During the early-2000s, early instances of shanzhai production began, mostly with simple counterfeiting of electronic goods including DVD and MP3 players in cities such as those in the Pearl River Delta.

In the mid-2000s, more advanced products such as smartphones were being created, with varying levels of skill and quality, leading to the term shanzhai being applied to counterfeit goods. By the end of 2006, it is estimated that shanzhai mobile phone manufacturers accounted for around 30 percent of the domestic phone market in China.

In 2009, it was reported that shanzhai mobile phones could be sold for about $100 to $150 USD, while production costs were only about $20 USD.

In 2010, the Financial Times estimated that shanzhai phones accounted for about 20 percent of the global 2G mobile phone market. Demand for these 2G-era shanzhai mobile phones was not only in China, but particularly in developing countries in Asia, Africa, and Latin America as well.

The prevalence of shanzhai phones is usually attributed to their low price, multi-functional performance, and imitations of trendy mobile phone design. Although shanzhai companies do not use branding as a marketing strategy, they are known for their flexibility of design to meet specific market needs.

However, shanzhai isn't limited to mobile phones. As Yu Hua explains:

Reflecting the interests of customers, some shanzhai companies reflect politics and culture through their products, often alongside parody. One of the most well-publicized examples of this was during Barack Obama's 2008 U.S. presidential election campaign, when some shanzhai mobile phone companies began to include Obama-based themes in their goods and advertisements. Also in 2008, some shanzhai products were based on the Beijing National Stadium and Fuwa in light of the Beijing Olympic Games that year.

In January 2011 the Chinese Ministry of Industry and Information Technology and the State Administration of Industry and Commerce announced a crackdown on shanzhai phone sellers and manufacturers. The administration blamed "money-stealing" services that used the cheap phones to steal services using customers' SIM cards. Industry commentator Liu Sheng said that it was more likely to be linked to the country's intellectual property rights protection campaigns.

Decline 
Since the 2010s, there has been a decrease in the prevalence of shanzhai products within China. Although some groups and individuals do still make replica or fake versions of popular products, the growth of well-established domestic companies producing low-cost and/or high-quality electronic goods has eclipsed much of the market for counterfeit goods. Groups that do counterfeit domestic companies are also often subject to legal repercussions for their actions, while the counterfeiting of foreign goods is much more difficult to prosecute.

Another reason involved in the decline in shanzhai electronics may be related to the transition of MediaTek to producing chips for more established companies, rather than just for the general consumer market. During the early-2000s, many shanzhai mobile phones used MediaTek chips, since they were inexpensive and were widely available. This transition has made it more difficult for small groups to produce smartphones and other popular electronic products to the same extent that was possible in the early-2000s.

Notable brands 
CECT is a company which offered unauthorized clones or replicas of the Apple iPhone and various Nokia cell phones sold at a fraction of the price of the originals during the 2G and 3G eras. At least one reseller has been subject to legal demands from Apple.
 One company that earned notoriety for producing shanzhai smartphones is Goophone, which in 2012 was reported to have filed a patent for the "Goophone i5", a MediaTek-powered clone marketed prior to the real iPhone 5's official release.

Internet 
Due to the growth of internet access in China, websites have been created that attempt to spoof real ones, some with the intent to scam. In 2019, the Ministry of Public Security reported that since 2016 more than 5,000 shanzhai websites had been shut down, alongside 16,000 online groups, and 20,000 accounts. Some of these were said to include deceptive wording in their names, with terms such as "Central" "China" ( or ) and "National" used to imitate real government websites and users.

Subculture 
The subculture surrounding shanzhai both covers the subculture that developed among groups producing shanzhai goods, such as in the Pearl River Delta, as well as a more generally-supported subculture based on parodying popular franchises and trends.

Some of the most well-known events include the CCSTV New Year's Gala, Shanzhai Lecture Room, Shanzhai Olympic Torch Relay, and Shanzhai Nobel Prize. One thing these events have in common is that they all imitate high-end, popular yet authoritative events in which grass-roots power usually has no participating role.

Shanzhai movies are another profit-driven shanzhai phenomenon. These movies usually have low budgets, yet achieve commercial success by parodying, making fun of or borrowing elements from high-end Hollywood blockbuster movies. One of the first shanzhai movies is Ning Hao's Crazy Stone. It imitates the multi-angle shooting, rapid cutting and stunts that are usually used in Hollywood action movies, yet it retains a grass-roots set up. With only a $3 million HKD budget, Crazy Stone achieved a box office revenue of $22 million HKD.

Critical reception 

In the Western world in countries such as the United States, shanzhai products are often viewed as humorous fakes due to their common use of misspelled or comical names imitating those of real companies. Generally, shanzhai products are viewed in the West as low-quality, cheap, and fake. The influence of this view of shanzhai goods has led to the perception among some that all Chinese-produced goods are low quality or are fakes of foreign goods.

Shanzhai products are negatively perceived by many companies whose products have been counterfeited, both in China and abroad. Within China, companies such as Huawei and Lenovo have faced issues of smaller companies and groups counterfeiting of their goods. Although electronics companies are most prone to this kind of counterfeiting, other industries have faced competition from shanzhai companies as well.

However, Byung-Chul Han believes shanzhai products are valuable in their right:

In 2019, the Jinhongye Paper Group successfully won a lawsuit against the Hangzhou Fuyang Paper Company for their shanzhai version of one of Jinhongye's products, which was regarded as an improvement in commercial protections. Jinhongye produces high quality paper marketed as Qingfeng, which Hangzhou Fuyang imitated in their sale of paper similarly marketed as Qingfeng. After a ruling by the Hangzhou Internet Court, Hangzhou Fuyang was forced to pay 1 million RMB to Jinhongye and to stop marketing their paper as Qingfeng.

Business analyst Michael Zakkour believes the phenomena of shanzhai reduces foreign investment in China, discourages foreign companies from marketing copyable products there, and deters them from using Chinese services and technologies that might result in their intellectual property being copied.

See also 
Counterfeit consumer goods
Intellectual property in China
Trademark infringement
Japanese Television Cartel
Dafen Village
Zhing-zhong, a Zimbabwean term for Chinese goods

References

Further reading

External links
"In the Next Industrial Revolution, Atoms Are the New Bits"  By Chris Anderson. January 25, 2010, Wired Magazine Feb 2010

Commercial crimes
Economy of China
Crime in China
Industry in China
Copyright infringement
Chinese popular culture